Mississippi Masala is a 1991 romantic drama film directed by Mira Nair, based upon a screenplay by Sooni Taraporevala, starring Denzel Washington, Sarita Choudhury, and Roshan Seth. Set primarily in rural Mississippi, the film explores interracial romance between African Americans and Indian Americans.

It was released in France on 18 September 1991, in the United Kingdom on 17 January 1992 and in the U.S. on 5 February 1992. The film grossed $7,332,515 USD at the box office. The film was made a part of The Criterion Collection on May 24, 2022.

Plot

In 1972, dictator Idi Amin enacts a policy of forceful expulsion of Asians from Uganda. Jay, his wife Kinnu, and their daughter Mina, a family of Ugandan Indians residing in Kampala, reluctantly and tearfully leave their home behind and relocate. After spending a few years in England, the family settle in Greenwood, Mississippi to live with family members who own a chain of motels there. Despite the passage of time, Jay is unable to come to terms with his sudden departure from his home country, and cannot fully embrace the American lifestyle. He dreams of one day returning with his family to Kampala. The effects of Amin's dictatorship have caused Jay to become distrustful towards black people.

Mina, on the other hand, has fully assimilated to the American culture and has a diverse group of friends. She feels stifled by her parents' wish to only associate with members of their own community. She falls in love with Demetrius, a local African American self-employed carpet cleaner. Mina is aware that her parents will not approve and keeps the relationship somewhat secret. The pair decide to spend a romantic clandestine weekend together in Biloxi, where they are spotted by members of the Indian community, and the gossip begins to spread. Jay is outraged and ashamed, and forbids Mina from ever seeing Demetrius again. Mina also faces both subtle and outright dislike from Demetrius' community. Demetrius confronts Jay, who reveals his experiences and racist treatment in Uganda, causing Demetrius to call out Jay on his hypocrisy. Ultimately, the two families cannot fully come to terms with the interracial pair, who flee the state together in Demetrius's van.

Jay's wish finally becomes reality when he travels to Kampala to attend a court proceeding on the disposition of his previously confiscated house. While in the country however, he sees how much it has changed and realises that he no longer identifies with the land of his birth. Jay returns to America and relinquishes his long-nurtured dream of returning to Uganda, the place he considered home.

Cast

Production
The script was written in Brooklyn, New York, after research by Nair, Taraporevala, and their team in Mississippi and Kampala. While doing research in Mississippi, Nair met a carpet cleaner named Demetrius and decided to model the main character after him. Ben Kingsley was originally cast in the role of Mina's father, but he eventually withdrew from the project, prompting the original backers of the film to pull out. Nair was able to gain new funding after Denzel Washington was chosen for the role of Demetrius. She later mentioned she faced substantial pressure from potential backers to select white leads rather than Indians or African Americans. The Mississippi-based scenes were filmed in Mississippi, in the towns of Greenwood, Grenada, Biloxi, and Ocean Springs. The Uganda scenes were filmed in Kampala, Uganda, including in Nair's home. Though the Monte Cristo motel was an existing business chosen by Nair and production designer Mitch Epstein for shooting, the production crew added a dark green trim to the exterior to echo the verdant landscape of Uganda.

Reception

The film was positively received by critics. It received a 92% fresh rating on Rotten Tomatoes from 73 reviews with the consensus: "Sarita Choudhury and Denzel Washington’s romantic chemistry lights up the screen in Mississippi Masala, Mira Nair’s observant and sexy tale of cultures clashing."

Awards and honors
 1993 NAACP Image Award for Outstanding Actor in a Motion Picture – Denzel Washington
 1991 São Paulo International Film Festival – Mira Nair, Critics Special Award
 1991 48th Venice International Film Festival – Golden Osella Best Original Screenplay – Sooni Taraporevala; Golden Ciak/Best Film – Mira Nair

The film is recognized by American Film Institute in these lists:
 2002: AFI's 100 Years...100 Passions – Nominated

Home media 
On May 24, 2022, The Criterion Collection released Mississippi Masala in a newly restored 4K edition on Blu-ray and DVD. The special edition includes new interviews from Nair, Taraporevala, production designer and photographer Mitch Epstein, and cinematographer Edward Lachman.

References

External links

Mississippi Masala: The Ocean of Comings and Goings an essay by Bilal Qureshi at the Criterion Collection
Official trailer

1991 films
1991 romantic drama films
1991 independent films
African-American romantic drama films
African-American films
Films about Indian Americans
British Indian films
1990s English-language films
Films about Indian weddings
Films about interracial romance
Films about racism
Films about weddings
1990s American films
Films about women in the Indian diaspora
Films set in Mississippi
Films shot in Mississippi
Films shot in Uganda
Films set in Uganda
Films directed by Mira Nair
Films produced by Michael Nozik
Films set in 1972
Films set in 1990
The Samuel Goldwyn Company films
Cultural depictions of Idi Amin
Films about forced migration
Films with screenplays by Sooni Taraporevala
Mirabai Films films
Films scored by L. Subramaniam